Portrait of a President (1962) is William Manchester's description of U.S. President John F. Kennedy.  It was based on Manchester's 1962 Holiday magazine article.

Notes

1962 non-fiction books
American biographies
Biographies of John F. Kennedy
Little, Brown and Company books